Anthony Alexander Jarrett (born 13 August 1968 in Enfield, London) is a male former sprint and hurdling athlete from England.

Athletics career
He was a silver medalist in the 110 metres hurdles at the World Championships in 1993 and 1995, and at the European Championships in 1990, and won the gold medal in the event at the Commonwealth Games in 1990 and 1998.

Jarrett came fourth in the 110m hurdles at the 1992 Summer Olympics in Barcelona, missing out on a bronze medal by 1000th of a second to Jack Pierce of the United States. He again narrowly missed out on an Olympic medal when he was a member of the 4 × 100 m sprint relay team that also finished 4th in the Olympic final of that year. Four years earlier in 1988 he finished in 6th place in the 110m hurdles at the 1988 Summer Olympics in Seoul.

He represented England and won a gold medal as part of the 4 x 100 metres relay team and a silver medal in the 110 metres hurdles, at the 1990 Commonwealth Games in Auckland, New Zealand. Four years later he represented England and won another silver medal, at the 1994 Commonwealth Games in Victoria, British Columbia, Canada. He represented England for a third Games and won a gold medal, at the 1998 Commonwealth Games in Kuala Lumpur, Malaysia. He also made a fourth appearance during the 2002 Manchester Commonwealth Games.

Jarrett's career was overshadowed by the achievements of fellow Briton Colin Jackson, who beat him into second place on numerous occasions at major competitions such as the World Championships, Commonwealth Games (twice), European Championships and Goodwill Games. Jackson also defeated Jarrett eight times at the national championships. In all Jarrett won two individual world silver medals and one individual bronze medal in the 110m hurdles, and another silver and bronze medal in the 4 × 100 m sprint relay.

Jarrett was disqualified for false starts at both the 2000 Summer Olympics in Sydney in the first round, and in the semi-finals of the 2001 World Championships, events from which he appeared never to recover.

Jarrett's personal best time for the 110m hurdles is 13.00 seconds, set when he finished as runner-up to Jackson at the 1993 World Championships.

Other Achievements
1987 European Athletics Junior Championships
Gold medal
1994 Goodwill Games
Silver medal
1994 IAAF World Cup
Gold medal
1999 European Cup
Silver medal

References

1968 births
Living people
English male hurdlers
British male sprinters
English male sprinters
Olympic athletes of Great Britain
Athletes (track and field) at the 1988 Summer Olympics
Athletes (track and field) at the 1992 Summer Olympics
Athletes (track and field) at the 1996 Summer Olympics
Athletes (track and field) at the 2000 Summer Olympics
Commonwealth Games gold medallists for England
Commonwealth Games silver medallists for England
Athletes (track and field) at the 1990 Commonwealth Games
Athletes (track and field) at the 1994 Commonwealth Games
Athletes (track and field) at the 1998 Commonwealth Games
Athletes (track and field) at the 2002 Commonwealth Games
People from Enfield, London
World Athletics Championships medalists
European Athletics Championships medalists
Commonwealth Games medallists in athletics
Goodwill Games medalists in athletics
Competitors at the 1994 Goodwill Games
Medallists at the 1990 Commonwealth Games
Medallists at the 1994 Commonwealth Games
Medallists at the 1998 Commonwealth Games